The Fujinon XF 23mm F1.4 R is an interchangeable camera lens announced by Fujifilm on September 5, 2013.

References

Camera lenses introduced in 2013
23